Silver Spoons is an American sitcom television series that aired on NBC from September 25, 1982, to May 11, 1986, and in first-run syndication from September 27, 1986, to May 30, 1987. The series was produced by Embassy Television for the first four seasons, until Embassy Communications moved the series to syndication after being cancelled by NBC. Silver Spoons was created by Martin Cohan, Howard Leeds and Ben Starr.

The show focuses on the wealthy playboy Edward Stratton III, and his relationship with his young son Ricky Stratton. Ricky was the product of a brief marriage between Edward and Ricky's mother. Edward was unaware that he had a son until Ricky comes to live with Edward at the outset of the series. The main cast stars Joel Higgins as Edward, Ricky Schroder as Ricky, Leonard Lightfoot as Edward's attorney, Franklyn Seales as Edward's business manager, and Erin Gray as Edward's personal assistant and later love interest. Jason Bateman plays Ricky's best friend over the first two seasons of the show, replaced by Alfonso Ribeiro over the remaining seasons. John Houseman plays Edward's dour and disapproving father.

Synopsis
In the pilot episode, Ricky Stratton (Ricky Schroder) arrives at the mansion of the father he has never met to introduce himself, move in, and get to know him better. Edward Stratton III (Joel Higgins) epitomizes the phrase "overgrown child"; he has never taken responsibility for anything in his life, including his toy business, Eddie's Toys. Ricky recognizes that his father needs to grow up; Edward thinks his son is too uptight and needs to have more fun while he is still young.

Edward's father (Edward Stratton II) is played by John Houseman as the intelligent, well-to-do patriarch and industrialist whose demeanor starkly contrasts with Edward's and seems more similar to Ricky's (at first). Throughout the series, the comic tension arises between Grandfather Stratton's belief that people with money are obligated to make more money and Edward's belief that money should be used to make people happy. Ricky is often caught between the two, wishing only for peace and harmony within the family.

Ricky's mother is Evelyn Bluthorn (Christine Belford). Edward and Evelyn's romantic relationship led to a week-long marriage. Now Evelyn has remarried and placed Ricky in a military boarding school. When Ricky arrives at the Stratton residence, Edward is stunned to discover that his long-ago brief marriage produced a son (when he expresses incredulousness because he "wasn't married that long," Ricky points out, "It doesn't take that long"). At first, he sends Ricky right back to the boarding school; later he dresses up as a swamp monster to take Ricky out of the school and back to the mansion to live with him. The mansion is stocked with arcade games and a scale-model freight train runs through it.

Edward exhibits his childishness and playfulness in many ways, such as performing a little dance while the Pac-Man game plays its theme song. Stratton's personal assistant, Kate Summers (Erin Gray), is often the voice of reason. Kate's role adds tension to the show and provides incentive for Edward to act more maturely (at least sometimes). Edward and Kate's will-they-or-won't-they relationship gives way to a third-season wedding.

During the series' early years, Ricky befriends "bad boy" Derek Taylor (Jason Bateman, seasons 1–2), smooth-talking "cowboy" J.T. Martin (Bobby Fite, seasons 1–2), and "nerdy" Freddy Lippincottleman (Corky Pigeon, seasons 1–4). They get into a lot of trouble and learn many childhood lessons along the way. Leslie Crambottom, played by Georgi Irene, has a major crush on Ricky.

Edward's original attorney was Leonard Rollins (Leonard Lightfoot), who departed after the first season, and was replaced by the aptly named business manager, Dexter Stuffins (Franklyn Seales), who was somewhat stuffier and more erudite than Leonard had been. Dexter remained through the rest of the series and was joined in fall 1984 by his hip, breakdancing nephew Alfonso Spears (Alfonso Ribeiro, seasons 3–5), who became Ricky's new best friend. Once Ricky, Freddy, and Alfonso were in high school in season four, their circle was completed by Brad (Billy Jacoby, seasons 4–5), a reintroduction of the type of "bad-boy" character similar to that of Derek during the show's early years. That year, as Kate and Edward adjusted to married life, Kate's doddering uncle, Harry Summers (Ray Walston), moved into the Stratton mansion.

Cast

Main cast
Ricky Schroder as Richard Bluthorn "Rick" or "Ricky" Stratton
Joel Higgins as Edward Stratton III
Erin Gray as Katherine "Kate" Summers-Stratton
Leonard Lightfoot as Leonard Rollins (Season 1)
Franklyn Seales as Dexter Roosevelt Stuffins (Guest season 1; Main seasons 2–5)
Alfonso Ribeiro as Alfonso Spears (Seasons 3–5)

Recurring cast
Jason Bateman as Derek Taylor (Seasons 1–2)
Bobby Fite as J.T. Martin (Seasons 1–2)
Corky Pigeon as Fredrick March "Freddy" Lippincottleman (Seasons 1–4)
Billy Jacoby as Brad Langford (Seasons 4–5)
John Houseman as Grandfather Edward Stratton II (Seasons 1–5)
Christine Belford as Evelyn Bluthorn Stratton (Seasons 1–5)
Ray Walston as Uncle Harry Summers (Season 4)

Episodes

Silver Spoons ran for five seasons with a total of 116 episodes, from September 25, 1982, to May 30, 1987.

Production

Music
The show's theme song titled "Together", was written by Rik Howard and Bob Wirth. The original version was accompanied mostly by guitar with vocals by Ron Dante. Two other versions of the theme were used during the show's run. A synthesized version was used in 1985 with a different vocalist. The third version of the theme, a rock version, was introduced in January 1986 and began in use during the second half of season 4 with vocals again by Ron Dante and composed by Ray Colcord.

Locations
The brick Tudor period mansion shown in the opening credits (representing the Stratton mansion) is actually a private residence located in Warwickshire, England. The elaborate home, named Compton Wynyates, was built in 1481. Before Silver Spoons, it was used in the 1977 Disney film Candleshoe, starring Helen Hayes, Jodie Foster and David Niven.

Broadcast history

Initial run

Reruns and syndication
Reruns of Silver Spoons aired as a part of NBC's daytime schedule in the summer of 1985.

The show was also rerun on WWOR's superstation feed from December 28, 1992, to September 3, 1993. Select episodes were also aired on Nick at Nite in 2001 and 2005.

FamilyNet (now The Cowboy Channel) aired reruns of the series nightly, until June 30, 2017, when the network underwent a programming format change the following day. Antenna TV began airing reruns of the series starting in January 2018, as well as GAC Family on October 4, 2021.

The series is currently available for streaming online on The Roku Channel and Tubi in the United States and CTV's streaming service, CTV Throwback in Canada.

International airing
In France, the series aired as Ricky ou la Belle Vie (Ricky or the Good Life) as part of a block called Destination Noël (Destination Christmas) from December 21, 1984 until January 2, 1985. Then on Vitamine (Vitamin) under the name Ricky la Belle Vie (Ricky the Good Life) as part of a block Croque-vacanes (Holiday Bites) on TF1.

In Italy, the series aired on Canale 5 & Italia 1 as il mio amico Ricky (My Friend Ricky) in 1984.

Home media
On June 19, 2007, Sony Pictures Home Entertainment released the first season of Silver Spoons on DVD in Region 1. As of 2015, this release has been discontinued and is out of print. It is unknown if the remaining 4 seasons will be released.

See also

 Diff'rent Strokes (1978)
 You Again? (1986)
 The Fresh Prince of Bel-Air (1990)

References

External links
 
 Silver Spoons at Retro Junk

1980s American sitcoms
1982 American television series debuts
1987 American television series endings
American television series revived after cancellation
English-language television shows
First-run syndicated television programs in the United States
NBC original programming
Television series about children
Television series by Sony Pictures Television
Television shows set in New York (state)